The 2003–04 NBA season was the Grizzlies' ninth season in the National Basketball Association, and their third season in Memphis. It was also the final season playing their home games at the Pyramid Arena. They moved into FedExForum the next season. During the offseason, the Grizzlies signed free agent James Posey. After two unsuccessful seasons ever since they moved to Memphis, the Grizzlies finally played around .500 holding a 9–8 record as they acquired Bonzi Wells from the Portland Trail Blazers in early December. However, the team struggled posting a 7-game losing streak at the end of the month. Despite this, the Grizzlies continued to play their best basketball posting an 8-game winning streak in January, and winning 13 of their 15 games in March, as they made the playoffs for the first time in their franchise history, finishing fourth in the Midwest Division with a 50–32 record.

Pau Gasol continued to lead the team in scoring, rebounds and blocks, and 70-year old head coach Hubie Brown was named Coach of The Year. However, the Grizzlies lost in the first round of the playoffs, losing four games straight to the defending champion San Antonio Spurs.

Draft picks

Roster

Regular season

Season standings

z - clinched division title
y - clinched division title
x - clinched playoff spot

Record vs. opponents

Game log

Playoffs

|- align="center" bgcolor="#ffcccc"
| 1
| April 17
| @ San Antonio
| L 74–98
| Bonzi Wells (16)
| Stromile Swift (7)
| Jason Williams (3)
| SBC Center18,797
| 0–1
|- align="center" bgcolor="#ffcccc"
| 2
| April 19
| @ San Antonio
| L 70–87
| Pau Gasol (20)
| Pau Gasol (11)
| Jason Williams (4)
| SBC Center18,797
| 0–2
|- align="center" bgcolor="#ffcccc"
| 3
| April 22
| San Antonio
| L 93–95
| Pau Gasol (18)
| Swift, Wright (6)
| Gasol, Williams (3)
| The Pyramid19,351
| 0–3
|- align="center" bgcolor="#ffcccc"
| 4
| April 25
| San Antonio
| L 97–110
| Pau Gasol (22)
| James Posey (11)
| Jason Williams (8)
| The Pyramid19,351
| 0–4
|-

Player statistics

Season

Playoffs

Awards and records
Hubie Brown, NBA Coach of the Year Award
Jerry West, NBA Executive of the Year Award

References

See also
2003-04 NBA season

Memphis Grizzlies seasons
Memphis
Memphis Grizzlies
Memphis Grizzlies
Events in Memphis, Tennessee